One-Eyed Jacks is a 1961 American Western film directed by and starring Marlon Brando, his only directorial credit. Brando portrays the lead character Rio, and Karl Malden plays his partner, "Dad" Longworth. The supporting cast features Pina Pellicer, Katy Jurado, Ben Johnson and Slim Pickens.

In 2018, the film was selected for preservation in the United States National Film Registry by the Library of Congress.

Plot

Rio, his mentor Dad Longworth, and a third man called Doc rob a bank of two saddlebags of gold in Sonora, Mexico in 1880. Mexican rurales (mounted police) catch them celebrating in a cantina and kill Doc. Dad and Rio escape, but Dad leaves Rio to be taken by the rurales. Rio is arrested and spends five hard years in a Sonora prison. He escapes and travels to Monterey, California, where Dad has become sheriff. Rio plans to kill Dad and rob the bank in Monterey with his new partners Chico Modesto and Bob Emory.

Plans are sidetracked when Rio falls in love with Dad's beautiful stepdaughter, Louisa. Rio takes advantage of a fiesta (festival) to spend the night with her on the beach. Dad tries to punish Louisa for what happened, but backs down after intervention by his wife, Maria. Instead, he traps Rio, whips him in public, and smashes his gun hand to make sure Rio will never be able to beat him in a gunfight. While recovering from his wounds, Rio struggles with his conflicting desires to love the girl and to get revenge on her stepfather. He decides to forgo vengeance, fetch Louisa, and leave town.

Emory and a partner kill Chico and pull off the bank job without Rio's knowledge. The heist goes wrong and a young girl is killed. Dad accuses Rio of the crime. Dad has one last private talk with Rio, again attempting to absolve himself for all he has done. Rio replies, "You're a one-eyed jack around here, Dad, but I've seen the other side of your face". Rio tells him he had been imprisoned for the last five years, but Dad calls it a lie.

Louisa visits Rio in jail to tell him she is going to have his baby. He is then beaten by sadistic deputy Lon Dedrick, who desired and has been denied Louisa's affection. Maria confronts Dad and insists on being told the truth about the relationship between him and Rio, stating she knew something was wrong since the moment Rio arrived. She says she knows Dad wants to hang him purely out of guilt. Dad tells her she has no appreciation for everything he has done for her.

Louisa attempts to smuggle a Derringer to Rio, but she is discovered by Dedrick, who carries her out of the jail, leaving the gun on a table. While they are out, Rio is able to get hold of the pistol. Pointing the unloaded gun at Dedrick when he returns, Rio bluffs his way out of jail in a tense confrontation. Rio takes Dedrick's revolver, beats him unconscious, and locks him in a cell. As Rio is making his escape, he is spotted by Dad, riding into town. Under fire, in the final showdown Rio shoots Dad dead.

Rio and Louisa ride out to the dunes and say a sentimental farewell. Now a hunted man, Rio tells Louisa that he might go to Oregon, but will return for her in the spring.

Cast

Adaptation and development

Rod Serling, creator of The Twilight Zone television series, wrote an adaptation of the 1956 novel The Authentic Death of Hendry Jones by Charles Neider, at the request of producer Frank P. Rosenberg. The book was a fictional treatment of the familiar Billy the Kid story, relocated from New Mexico to the Monterey Peninsula in California. The adaptation was rejected.

Rosenberg next hired Sam Peckinpah, who finished his first script on 11 November 1957. Marlon Brando's Pennebaker Productions had paid $40,000 for the rights to Authentic Death and then signed a contract with Stanley Kubrick to direct for Paramount Pictures. Peckinpah handed in a revised screenplay on 6 May 1959. Brando later fired Peckinpah and hired Calder Willingham to further revise the film's script, but he too was eventually fired. Guy Trosper was brought on as a final replacement. Additionally, Stanley Kubrick—for unknown reasons—stepped down from directing the film just two weeks before starting production. Brando volunteered to direct in his stead.

The movie ultimately bore little resemblance to the Neider novel, and what remains has much more resonance with history than fiction. At various times, the two credited screenwriters and the uncredited Peckinpah have claimed (or had claimed for them) a majority of the responsibility for the film. When Karl Malden was asked who really wrote the story, he said: "There is one answer to your question—Marlon Brando, a genius in our time."

Production

The film was Paramount Pictures' last feature released in VistaVision. Cinematographer Charles Lang received an Academy Award nomination in the Best Cinematography, Color category that year. Upon release, it made little money, leading to a string of unsuccessful films for Brando.

Marlon Brando shot a total of five hours of additional footage, some of which was later destroyed. Later, other directors worked on the rest of the film after Brando walked away from the production. He did not direct another film in his later years, but he did continue to act. In a 1975 Rolling Stone interview Brando said of directing, "You work yourself to death. You're the first one up in the morning... I mean, we shot that thing on the run, you know, you make up the dialogue the scene before, improvising, and your brain is going crazy".

Release
The film was released on March 30, 1961 in New York City. The film was selected for screening as part of the Cannes Classics section at the 2016 Cannes Film Festival. The Cannes screening was that of a 4K restoration supervised by Martin Scorsese, Steven Spielberg, and The Film Foundation.

Critical reception
One-Eyed Jacks received mixed reviews from critics. On the review aggregator Rotten Tomatoes, the film has a 61% approval rating based on 18 reviews, with an average rating of 6.3/10.

Bosley Crowther of The New York Times, favorably influenced by Brando's efforts, noted: "Directed and played with the kind of vicious style that Mr. Brando has put into so many of his skulking, scabrous roles. Realism is redolent in them, as it is in many details of the film. But, at the same time, it is curiously surrounded by elements of creamed-cliché romance and a kind of pictorial extravagance that you usually see in South Sea island films."

Variety, on the other hand, wrote: "It is an oddity of this film that both its strength and its weakness lie in the area of characterization. Brando's concept calls, above all, for depth of character, for human figures endowed with overlapping good and bad sides to their nature." Dave Kehr of The Chicago Reader wrote: "There is a strong Freudian pull to the situation (the partner's name is “Dad”) that is more ritualized than dramatized: the most memorable scenes have a fierce masochistic intensity, as if Brando were taking the opportunity to punish himself for some unknown crime."

In popular culture

One-Eyed Jacks is the name of a brothel in the TV series Twin Peaks created by David Lynch and Mark Frost. The film is mentioned in dialogue between characters Donna Hayward and Audrey Horne. Horne asks Hayward if she has heard of "One-Eyed Jacks" and Hayward responds, "Isn't that that Western with Marlon Brando?".

A short loop from the film plays on a cinema screen during a story mission in Cyberpunk 2077.

Home media and restoration
The film fell into the public domain and for years was only available via numerous low quality, budget reissues on VHS and DVD. In 2016, work was completed on a "New 4K digital restoration, undertaken by Universal Pictures in partnership with The Film Foundation and in consultation with filmmakers Martin Scorsese and Steven Spielberg". This restoration was issued on Blu-ray and DVD in November 2016 by the Criterion Collection in the US, and in June 2017 by Arrow Video in the UK.

See also
 List of American films of 1961

References

External links

 
 
 
 
 
 One-Eyed Jacks: Zen Nihilism an essay by Howard Hampton at the Criterion Collection
 A Million Feet Of Film: The Making Of One-Eyed Jacks, a book on the film's production

1961 films
1960s English-language films
1961 Western (genre) films
American Western (genre) films
Films about bank robbery
Films based on American novels
Films based on Western (genre) novels
Films directed by Marlon Brando
Films scored by Hugo Friedhofer
Films set in 1880
Films set in 1885
Films set in Mexico
Films set on beaches
United States National Film Registry films
Revisionist Western (genre) films
1961 directorial debut films
1960s American films